James Bradshaw Adamson (December 27, 1921 – January 13, 2003) was a major general in the United States Army.

Early life and education
Adamson was born at Fort Clark, Texas in 1921. A graduate of West Point, the United States Military Academy, with a B.S. degree in military science and engineering in 1944 (he also earned a master's degree in business administration from the University of Miami School of Business at the University of Miami in 1959),

Military career
Adamson was commissioned into the infantry and saw active service in World War II as a platoon leader and in Vietnam as a brigade commander.

After leaving the Second Brigade, Fourth Infantry Division in 1967, he was appointed professorial chair of military science at The Citadel Military College.

Adamson's last posting was as Commander of Military District of Washington, which involved coordinating the military with the White House and supervising various ceremonial events, such as burials in Arlington National Cemetery. Among them was the state funeral of President Lyndon B Johnson.

He retired from active service in the Army in 1974.

Military honors
Adamson was awarded the Distinguished Service Medal (DSM), Legion of Merit (LM) with two Oak Leaf Clusters, Silver Star (SS), Purple Heart (PH), Bronze Star Medal (BSM), Air Medal (AM) with 6 Oak Leaf Clusters, and the Army Commendation Medal (ARCOM).

Personal life
Adamson married Marjorie Ann McCabe with whom he had four sons. Their son Patrick died in 1996. This marriage ended in divorce. He later married Shirley Miller.

Adamson died in 2003 in Jupiter, Florida and was buried at Arlington National Cemetery (Section 7, Grave 10201-B-1).

References 

1921 births
2003 deaths
People from Kinney County, Texas
United States Military Academy alumni
United States Army personnel of World War II
University of Miami Business School alumni
United States Army personnel of the Vietnam War
Recipients of the Air Medal
Recipients of the Silver Star
The Citadel, The Military College of South Carolina faculty
Recipients of the Legion of Merit
United States Army generals
Recipients of the Distinguished Service Medal (US Army)
People from Jupiter, Florida
Burials at Arlington National Cemetery
Military personnel from Texas